Tonu may refer to:
Tonu, a rhinoceros-like species of Neopet
Tonu Laijinglembi, a heroine in the epic cycles of incarnations of Meitei mythology
Tonu, Papua New Guinea
Tõnu, an Estonian masculine given name